Sunrise, also known as Muse House, is a historic home located near Gore, Frederick County, Virginia. It is a two-story, log and frame farmhouse in the Greek Revival style. The original section was built in 1818, with additions and modifications made around 1850, and around 1905. The main section measures approximately 18 feet by 39 feet and features a two-story, two-level, five bay, front porch and exterior fieldstone end chimney. Also on the property are the contributing meathouse and two barns. The house is bordered by fields, forest and apple, peach and cherry orchards.

It was listed on the National Register of Historic Places in 1995.

See also
 National Register of Historic Places listings in Frederick County, Virginia

References

External links
 

Houses on the National Register of Historic Places in Virginia
Greek Revival houses in Virginia
Houses completed in 1818
Houses in Frederick County, Virginia
National Register of Historic Places in Frederick County, Virginia